Livengood may refer to:

Livengood (surname)
Livengood, Alaska, a census-designated place in Yukon-Koyukuk Census Area, Alaska, United States
Livengood mine, a gold mine